is a 1975, Japanese drama film directed by Kirirō Urayama from a story by Hiroyuki Itsuki.

Cast 
 Ken Tanaka as Shinsuke, as a teenager
 Tomohiro Tanabe as Shinsuke, aged 10
 Ken Matsuda as Shinsuke, aged 6
 Haruhiko Urayama as Shinsuke, aged 3
 Tatsuya Nakadai as Yuki, Shinsuke's father
 Sayuri Yoshinaga as Shinsuke's stepmother
 Shinobu Ōtake as Ori-eh, as a teenager
 Rie Yamazaki as Ori-eh, as a little girl
 Toshie Kobayashi, Seki
 Jūkei Fujioka, Kijima
 Takuya Fujioka as Owner
 Akira Kobayashi, Goro
 Masumi Harukawa, Geisha
 Kazunaga Tsuji, Nagata
 Susumu Fujita, Yabe Tora

References

External links 

1975 drama films
1975 films
Films produced by Sanezumi Fujimoto
Films set in Fukuoka Prefecture
1970s Japanese films